Lone Pine Unified School District, commonly abbreviated LPUSD, is located in Inyo County, California. It consists of two school sites.

School Sites
The district consists of two school sites:
Lone Pine High School
Lo-Inyo Elementary School

References

External links
 

School districts in Inyo County, California